Guerret El Anz is the time of the year, according to the Berber calendar, between February 14 and February 19.

This period is known by its cruel cold.

Etymology 
The word "Guerret" comes from the French word "guerre" which means "war" in English.
"El Anz" is an Arabic word which means "goats".

This expression describe the intense cold during this period like a war endured by the goats who are not very resistant to the cold due to their fine skins.

History 
In Tunisia, it is usual to say "Tjamber Koul w Gamber" (Arabic: تجمبر كول وقمبر). It is an expression that expresses the need to collect the "oula" and vegetables during "Guerret El Anz".

References

See also 
Ice Saints

Berber culture